Gilakajan (also Romanized as Gīlākajān and Gīlākjān) is a village in Reza Mahalleh Rural District, in the Central District of Rudsar County, Gilan Province, Iran. At the 2006 census, its population was 720, in 226 families.

References 

Populated places in Rudsar County